American Family Day is the 14th state-recognized holiday in Arizona, Title 1-301.  American Family Day, much like Mothers Day or Father's Day is a non-paid holiday established as a separate day to appreciate family members by spending time with them.  Families are discouraged from buying gifts or other material items.

Arizona resident, John Makkai, is credited with pushing the holiday through the Arizona legislation.  American Family Day began as a 1-year proclamation, signed by then Governor Raúl Héctor Castro, declaring August 7, 1977 American Family Day.  The following year, American Family Day was signed into law as an official Arizona holiday by Governor Bruce Babbitt.  The holiday also caught on in several other states, including North Carolina and Georgia.

From the Georgia Department of Education Parent Engagement Program, "American Family Day – this day brings families together to share their love and appreciation of one another."

See also

 Family Day
 Father's Day
 Mother's Day
 Hallmark holiday
 International Mother's Day Shrine
 International Women's Day
 May crowning
 Mothering Sunday
 National Grandparents Day

References

External links

 Arizona State Laws – Attorney.org 

Public holidays in the United States
Arizona culture
Holidays and observances by scheduling (nth weekday of the month)
August observances
Sunday observances
1977 establishments in Arizona
Family member holidays